Chauncey Robert Bangs (February 28, 1901 – February 18, 1952) was a Canadian pair skater. He was born in Ottawa, Ontario. With partner Marion McDougall, he won the gold medal at the Canadian Figure Skating Championships in 1927 and 1928. He later paired with Frances Claudet, capturing the 1931 Canadian title.  The duo finished sixth at the 1932 Winter Olympic Games and fifth at that year's World Figure Skating Championships.

Results
(with Frances Claudet)

(with Marion McDougall)

References
 

1901 births
1952 deaths
Canadian male pair skaters
Figure skaters at the 1932 Winter Olympics
Olympic figure skaters of Canada